The End We Start From is an upcoming British survival film directed by Mahalia Belo and starring Jodie Comer, with Benedict Cumberbatch, Katherine Waterston and Mark Strong. It is adapted by Alice Birch from the novel of the same name by Megan Hunter.

Synopsis
After an ecological crisis a new mother and her baby abandon their home in flooded London and flee northwards.

Cast

 Jodie Comer
 Katherine Waterston as O
 Benedict Cumberbatch 
 Mark Strong 
 Joel Fry
 Gina McKee
 Nina Sosanya

Production
Benedict Cumberbatch's company SunnyMarch with Hera Pictures acquired the rights in May 2017 to Megan Hunter's debut novel The End We Start From before the book had been published. Cumberbatch was quoted as saying it was "a stunning tale of motherhood [and] a striking and frighteningly real story of a family fighting for survival that will make everyone stop and think about what kind of planet we are leaving behind for our children". Cumberbatch was announced as a producer alongside Hera Pictures founder Liza Marshall, Adam Ackland, and Sophie Hunter. In May 2022, it was announced that Mahalia Belo would direct an Alice Birch screenplay adaptation of the novel with Jodie Comer attached to appear as the central mother character. Production was listed as being completed by SunnyMarch through Leah Clarke and Ackland and Hera Pictures' Marshall alongside Amy Jackson and Hunter. With BBC Film and Anton adding finance, executive producers were Comer, Cumberbatch, Eva Yates, Cecile Gaget and Sébastien Raybaud. In August 2022, it was revealed that Katherine Waterston had been added to the cast. In September 2022, it was confirmed that Cumberbatch and Mark Strong, Joel Fry, Gina McKee, and Nina Sosanya had been added to the cast and that principal photography had begun in London. Strong had been added as an executive producer along with Kate Maxwell, Fanny Soulier and Pieter Engels from Anton, and Claudia Yusef for BBC Film. C2 Motion Picture Group had been brought in for funding with Dave Caplan and Jason Cloth in as executive producers, with National Lottery funding coming via the BFI with Lizzie Francke acting as an executive producer. A budget of £9 million has been reported for the project. Also confirmed as working on the project were Suzie Lavelle as cinematographer, PC Williams as costume designer, production designer Laura Ellis-Cricks and hair and make-up designer Louise Coles. Director Belo described the film as a "unique and original take on a survival film. One that feels in tune with the climate crisis we are experiencing now." As well as London, another filming location was reported to have been the disused boarding school Carmel College in southern Oxfordshire.

References

External links

Upcoming films
Dystopian films
British post-apocalyptic films
21st-century dystopian films
2020s dystopian films
Flood films
British disaster films
Environmental films
Climate change films